The men's singles tennis event was part of the tennis programme and took place between October 7 and 12, at the Geumjeong Tennis Stadium.

Schedule
All times are Korea Standard Time (UTC+09:00)

Results
Legend
r — Retired

Finals

Top half

Section 1

Section 2

Bottom half

Section 3

Section 4

References 

2002 Asian Games Official Report, Page 736
Draw

External links 
Official Website

Tennis at the 2002 Asian Games